2009 Academy Awards may refer to:

 81st Academy Awards, the Academy Awards ceremony which took place in 2009
 82nd Academy Awards, the Academy Awards ceremony which took place in 2010